Charles Pilkington may refer to:
 Charles Pilkington (cricketer, born 1837), English cricketer and clergyman
 Charles Pilkington (cricketer, born 1876), English cricketer
 Charlie Pilkington (1897–1974), American boxer